Nilüfer Yumlu (born 31 May 1955), commonly known as Nilüfer, is a Turkish pop singer.

In 1992, one of her biggest hits, "Show Yapma", was included in the album Yine Yeni Yeniden. Also "Kar Taneleri" (1984, Nilüfer '84), "Mor Menekşe" (1988, Esmer Günler), "Esmer Günler" (1988, Esmer Günler),  "Eğrisi Doğrusu" (1994, Ne Masal Ne Rüya), "Mavilim" (1997, Nilüfer'le) and "Dünya Dönüyor" (1998, Yeniden Yetmişe) are her well-known hits.

Together with the band Nazar, she represented Turkey in the Eurovision Song Contest 1978, where she shared the 18th place with Seija Simola from Finland. Since 1997 she has been Turkey's National Ambassador to UNICEF. In 1998, she was awarded the honorary title of State Artist of Turkey. She developed breast cancer, but beat the cancer after a nine-month treatment.

Discography

Albums
 Nilüfer '74 (1974)
 Selam Söyle (1976)
 Müzik (1978)
 15 Şarkı (1979)
 Nilüfer '79 (1979)
 Nilüfer '80 (1980)
 Sensiz Olmaz (1982)
 Nilüfer '84 (1984)
 Bir Selam Yeter (1985)
 Geceler (1987)
 Esmer Günler (1988)
 Sen Mühimsin (1990)
 Yine Yeni Yeniden (1992)
 Ne Masal Ne Rüya (1994)
 Nilüferle (1997)
 Yeniden Yetmişe (1998)
 Büyük Aşkım (2001)
 Gözünaydın-Olur mu? Olur mu? (2003)
 Sürprizler (2004)
 Karar Verdim (2005)
 Karar Verdim + 3 Remiks (2006)
 Hayal (2009)
 12 Düet (2011) (sales: 114,000)
 13 Düet (2013) (sales: 47,000)
 Kendi Cennetim (2015)
 Yeniden Yeni Yine (2016)
 Kendine Bi' Şans Ver (2022)

45rpms and singles
 Kalbim Bir Pusula - Ağlıyorum Yine (1972)
 Dünya Dönüyor - Neden (1973)
 Göreceksin Kendini - Aldanırım Sanma (1973)
 Hatıra Defteri - Sen de Söyle (1973)
 Arkadaş Dur Bekle - Kim Ayırdı Sevenleri (1973) (With Modern Folk Trio and Tanju Okan)
 Akdeniz Çocukları - Akdeniz Çocukları (Enstrümental) (1973) (With Ali Kocatepe, Gökben, Ertan Anapa, Esin Engin ve Füsun Önal)
 Al Beni Çal Beni - Körebe (1974)
 Söyle Söyle Sever mi? - Başıma Gelenler (1974)
 Boşver - Boşverdim (1975)
 Oh Ya - Ara Sıra Bazı Bazı (1975)
 Bau Mir ein Paradies - Anatol (1975)
 Ali - Italiano (1975)
 Bilder im Meinem Herzen - Warum mussausgerechnet er es sein (1976)
 Of Aman Aman - Kaderime Kaderime (1976)
 Kim Arar Seni - Başka Sözüm Yok (1977)
 Ne Olacak Şimdi - Pişman Olacaksın (1977)
 Sevince - Darling (1978)
 Oh Oh - Beyaz Mendil (1979)
 Ben Seni Seven Kadın - Kime Küseyim? (1981)
 Sen Beni Tanımamışsın (2008)
 Zalimin Kararı (2010)
 Tik Tak (2019)

Filmography 
Televizyon

References

1955 births
Living people
People from Beyoğlu
Eurovision Song Contest entrants of 1978
Liceo Italiano alumni
State Artists of Turkey
Eurovision Song Contest entrants for Turkey
Turkish women singers
Turkish pop singers
UNICEF Goodwill Ambassadors
Singers from Istanbul
Turkish singer-songwriters
Turkish lyricists
Golden Butterfly Award winners